Guo Jing is the fictional protagonist of the wuxia novel The Legend of the Condor Heroes by Jin Yong. He also appears as a supporting character in the sequel, The Return of the Condor Heroes, and is mentioned by name in The Heaven Sword and Dragon Saber. He is a descendant of Guo Sheng, one of the 108 outlaws from Mount Liang in the classical novel Water Margin. Guo Jing and Yang Kang were both named by Qiu Chuji, who urges them to remember the Jingkang Incident and be loyal towards their native land, the Song Empire. Guo Jing is killed during the Battle of Xiangyang along with the rest of his family except his younger daughter, Guo Xiang.

In The Legend of the Condor Heroes
Guo Jing's hometown is in Niu Family Village. His father, Guo Xiaotian, was from Shandong but moved to Lin'an (present-day Hangzhou) after the Jurchen-led Jin Empire conquered the northern part of the Song Empire in the Jin–Song Wars. Guo Xiaotian met Li Ping in Lin'an and married her. Two years after their marriage, Guo Xiaotian was killed by a group of soldiers led by Duan Tiande during a raid ordered by Wanyan Honglie. Li Ping, who was pregnant with Guo Jing then, was captured and held hostage by Duan Tiande, but managed to escape later. She fled north and arrived in Mongolia, where she gave birth to Guo Jing. Guo Jing and his mother are taken in by some nomads later and become part of Genghis Khan's tribe. Guo Jing befriends the Khan's children and followers, and becomes anda (sworn brothers) with the Khan's fourth son, Tolui. He later meets the "Seven Freaks of Jiangnan" and learns martial arts from them. During battles between the Khan and his rivals, Guo Jing demonstrates his loyalty to the Khan by helping to fend off the attackers. The Khan sees Guo Jing as a loyal subject, places great faith and trust in him, and betroths his daughter, Huazheng, to him.

At the age of 18, Guo Jing leaves Mongolia to meet Yang Kang, the son of his father's sworn brother, Yang Tiexin, for a contest arranged 18 years ago by the "Seven Freaks of Jiangnan" and Qiu Chuji. He encounters several extraordinary martial artists, who teach him some of their skills. By chance, he finds two prized texts: the Nine Yin Manual and the Book of Wumu. The knowledge he gained from the books turned him into a formidable martial artist and skilled tactician as he gradually matures in his beliefs and ideals. He also meets his future wife, Huang Rong, and they go on adventures together and are eventually married.

Guo Jing returns to Mongolia after his trip to the Song Empire and joins Genghis Khan in the Mongol campaign against the Khwarezmid Empire. He plays a significant role in the capture of the city of Samarkand and returns home in triumph. When he discovers later that the Mongols are planning to invade the Song Empire, he renounces his loyalty to the Khan and flees from Mongolia. Thereafter, he establishes a base of operations in the city of Xiangyang. Since then, Guo Jing has dedicated his life to defending his homeland from foreign invaders.

In The Return of the Condor Heroes
Guo Jing appears as a supporting character in the sequel, which is set several years after the end of the first novel. The adult Guo Jing is now a prominent figure in the wulin (martial artists' community) and a highly revered hero in Han Chinese society. He faces the arduous task of raising the orphaned son of his late sworn brother, Yang Kang, and guiding him on the path of goodness. He had previously named the boy 'Yang Guo' in the hope that the boy would redeem his family's honour, which had been tarnished by Yang Kang's villainy. Guo Jing and Huang Rong also raise Wu Dunru and Wu Xiuwen as their apprentices.

Guo Jing and Huang Rong play active roles in shaping Yang Guo's character. For example, Guo Jing's image as a fervently loyal and chivalrous hero inspires Yang Guo and serves as a role model for the boy to follow. However, Yang Guo also sees the couple as enemies because of the roles they played in his father's death, even though they did not kill him. He often harbours the intention of killing them. Yang Guo's anger and hatred gradually subsides when he discovers Guo Jing's humble and kind character, and when he learns the true details about his father's past from Ke Zhen'e.

Guo Jing becomes an active member in defending the city of Xiangyang from Mongol invaders. After successfully establishing a base of operations in the city, Guo Jing and Huang Rong work closely with Xiangyang's military forces and their wulin allies to defend the city. The couple have three children; elder daughter Guo Fu and the twins Guo Xiang (girl) and Guo Polu (boy). Guo Xiang's name is inspired by the "Xiang" in "Xiangyang" while "Polu" means "defeat and drive away barbarians" (the "barbarians" refer to the Mongol invaders in this context).

Guo Jing uses his knowledge and experience from his earlier campaigns to counter the Mongol invasion. It is revealed in The Heaven Sword and Dragon Saber that Xiangyang eventually falls to the Mongol invaders, and that Guo Jing and his family died in the battle. Only Guo Xiang survived, and she founded the Emei School later.

Character description
Guo Jing has thick eyebrows, large eyes, a sturdy and strong stature, and a complexion somewhere between dark and fair. He is described to be "dumb", slow in learning and inarticulate. His most outstanding trait is his constant strife for moral rectitude, as seen when he faces a dilemma after Genghis Khan attempts to force him to lead the Mongol army to attack his native land. Although he was born and raised in Mongolia, he is unwilling to side with the Mongols to attack the Song Empire. In The Return of the Condor Heroes, the adult Guo Jing dedicates his life to defending the Song Empire from foreign invaders.

Martial arts and skills
Guo Jing is the most powerful martial artist of his generation, and one of the most formidable in the wulin in his lifetime. His profound mastery of several different types of martial arts and skills surpasses that of many others in the wulin. Towards the end of The Return of the Condor Heroes, Huang Rong names him the "Northern Hero" of the new generation of the Five Greats to replace his master, "Northern Beggar" Hong Qigong. His repertoire of skills and martial arts are described in the following sections:

Mongolia
Guo Jing is one of the finest archers in Mongolia. He was trained in his early days by the legendary archer Jebe. In his youth, he once shot down two eagles in the sky with a single arrow. The incident earned him fame and the admiration of Genghis Khan. In his childhood, he also played wrestling as a sport with the Khan's children and followers.

Seven Freaks of Jiangnan
Guo Jing was first introduced to Chinese martial arts by the "Seven Freaks of Jiangnan", a group of seven martial artists from Jiaxing. The Freaks find a six-year-old Guo Jing after a long search that brought them to Mongolia. They teach him all the skills they know to prepare him for an upcoming competition with Yang Kang. The Freaks did not teach him any inner energy cultivation techniques at all.

The skills taught to Guo Jing by the Freaks include:
 Demon Subduing Staff Skill
 Bare Handed Disarming Skill
 Bone and Joint Dislocation Hand
 Golden Dragon Whip Skill
 Southern Mountain Saber Skill
 Mountain Splitting Palm Skill
 Huyan Spear Skill
 Yue Maiden Swordplay

Quanzhen School
Ma Yu, Qiu Chuji and Wang Chuyi of the Quanzhen School teach Guo Jing some basics of their school's inner energy cultivation techniques. Guo Jing is able to understand the basis of Quanzhen's Big Dipper Formation after reading the Nine Yin Manual and observing the formation being deployed in actual combat.

Eighteen Subduing Dragon Palms

Guo Jing meets Hong Qigong by chance while out on adventure with Huang Rong. Huang Rong, worrying that her father will look down on Guo Jing due to his unimpressive mastery of martial arts, uses this chance to incite Hong Qigong to teach Guo Jing his most powerful skill. Tempted by Huang Rong's culinary skill, Hong Qigong agrees to teach Guo Jing the Eighteen Subduing Dragon Palms to repay Huang Rong's favours of preparing fine cuisine for him every day during the brief period of time he spent with them.

Zhou Botong
Guo Jing meets Zhou Botong on Peach Blossom Island and becomes sworn brothers with him. Zhou Botong teaches him the Seventy-two Styles Vacant Fist.

Zhou Botong also teaches him the Technique of Ambidexterity, which allows him to use two different sets of martial arts simultaneously. Unexpectedly, the slow learning Guo manages to master this technique in a short period of time, whereas his more intelligent wife is unable to grasp it at all.

Nine Yin Manual
Zhou Botong has with him a copy of the Nine Yin Manual, the most coveted martial arts manual of that era because of the incredible inner energy cultivation techniques and extraordinary skills it records. He has been forbidden by Wang Chongyang to learn the skills described in the book so he lets Guo Jing learn.

Military strategy
Guo Jing learnt military strategy and tactics from the Book of Wumu, a military treatise written by the Song general Yue Fei. The book is coveted by many, as it is widely believed that whoever possesses it will conquer the world. The Jurchens and Mongols are among those actively seeking the book.

Guo Jing finds the book by chance on Iron Palm Peak. He reads it thoroughly and employs some of the strategies during the war with the Khwarezmid Empire. The experience he gained from the Mongol campaigns and knowledge from the book turns him into a skilled military tactician.

Legacy
Before leaving for good, Yang Guo and Xiaolongnü gave Guo Xiang their Gentleman and Lady Swords and the Heavy Iron Sword. In The Heaven Sword and Dragon Saber, it is revealed that the swords were melted and reforged into the Heaven Reliant Sword and Dragon Slaying Saber.

Guo Jing wrote the Nine Yin Manual from memory during the siege of Xiangyang. He also wrote a martial arts manual for the 'Eighteen Dragon Subduing Palms'. Guo Jing also recorded all his military experiences and knowledge from the Book of Wumu on a piece of cloth. Both the scroll and the cloth were hidden at Taohua Island, the home of Guo Jing and Huang Rong. The co-ordinates of Taohua Island and the map to pass the maze on Taohua Island were separately hidden inside the blade of the Dragon Slaying Saber. The Heaven Reliant Sword was brought out of Xiangyang by Guo Xiang before the city was conquered, while the Dragon Slaying Saber was lost and disappeared after Guo Polu's death. The heroic deeds of Guo Jing and Huang Rong became jianghu legends and were occasionally mentioned in The Heaven Sword and Dragon Saber.

In other media
Notable actors who have portrayed Guo Jing in films and television series include Cho Tat-wah (1958), Alexander Fu (1977–1981), Jason Pai (1976-1995), Philip Kwok (1982), Felix Wong (1983), Bryan Leung (1983), Julian Cheung (1994), Li Yapeng (2003), Wang Luoyong (2006), Hu Ge (2008), Zheng Guolin (2014) and Yang Xuwen (2017).

Guo Jong is a main character in the 2000 role-playing video game Shachou Eiyuuden: The Eagle Shooting Heroes, released by Sony Computer Entertainment for the PlayStation.

Family tree

Notes

Literary characters introduced in 1959
Fictional archers
Jin Yong characters
The Legend of the Condor Heroes
The Return of the Condor Heroes
Condor Trilogy
Fictional military strategists
Fictional wushu practitioners
Fictional wrestlers
Fictional Song dynasty people
Fictional Han people
Role-playing video game characters